Chandramukhi is one of the pivotal characters in the 1917 Bengali novel Devdas by Sarat Chandra Chattopadhyay. Her character was inspired by the Hindu mystical singer Meera, who devoted her life to Lord Krishna; similarly Chandramukhi devoted her life to Devdas. Chandramukhi is portrayed as a Tawaif in the novel and its film adaptations. Chandramukhi means "moon faced" or "as beautiful as the moon" in Sanskrit.

In the novel
Chandramukhi is a courtesan who lives in Calcutta also known as Kolkata. She is considered the most beautiful and richest prostitute in the area of Chitpur. She is first introduced to Devdas by Chunnilal, who returns to Calcutta heartbroken after the marriage of Parvathi "Paro". Devdas, disgusted over Chandramukhi's profession insults her and leaves her kotha. Chandramukhi, impressed by Devdas's attitude, later falls in love with him after realizing his steadfast love for Paro. She leaves her profession for Devdas and convinces him to marry her; he, however, has to reluctantly reject her offer as he has devoted his life to Paro. In return, Chandramukhi does not force him to be with her but waits patiently for him. Subsequently, she also moves to Ashthajhari village, where she lives in a muddy house located at the bank of a river and helps the needy. After some struggle, she meets with Devdas again, who now accepts her love.

In the film

In most of the film adaptations of Devdas, the story of Chandramukhi is similar to the novel. However, in most of the films her humanitarian work in helping the needy is not depicted. Unlike in the novel, a scene in which Chandramukhi and Parvathi meet was added in Bimal Roy's 1955 version when Paro, played by Suchitra Sen riding in a human rickshaw, comes across Chandramukhi, played by Vyjayanthimala, who just stares at Paro without a single word being exchanged between them. The meeting scene of Paro and Chandramukhi in the 1955 version was still regarded as one of the memorable scene in Bollywood with the background music adding the impact to the scene. In the 2002 version, the director, Sanjay Leela Bhansali, extended the interaction between Paro and Chandramukhi, also showing them dancing together to the hit song "Dola Re Dola".

Performers

Social impact
Chandramukhi is one of the first characters in an Indian novel to deal with prostitution. She was often depicted as a prostitute with a heart of gold. The character of Chandramukhi had paved the way for other portrayals of prostitutes in films like Sadhna, Pyaasa and Pakeezah. Actresses such as Nargis, Suraiya and Bina Rai refused to enact the role of a prostitute in the 1955 film of Devdas, which later went to Vyjayanthimala.

Legacy
Chandramukhi was well-received in India by critics. In 2006, Rediff listed Chandramukhi in their list of "Bollywood's Best Tawaif". Nikhat Kazmi of The Times of India also ranked Chandramukhi at #5 in his list "Tart with a heart", saying that "The egotistical Paro may have given her boy friend the goby, but self-sacricficing Chandramukhi was willing to put everything on hold — her livelihood too — for her lover".

Awards
There are many actresses who have portrayed Chandramukhi in film adaptations of Devdas. The first notable award was won by Vyjayanthimala in 1956 when she won the Filmfare Awards, known as Bollywood's Oscar, in the Supporting Actress category. However, she was also the first person to decline the award, as she thought that her role was not a supporting one but was of equal importance and parallel to that of Parvathy in the 1955 version. Other actresses who played Chandramukhi in Hindi versions of the novel have also won this award.

The following are awards and nominations received by actresses who have played the role of Chandramukhi in film:

See also
 List of prostitutes and courtesans
 Hooker with a heart of gold

References

External links
 Chandramukhi on IMDb

Drama film characters
Fictional Bengali people
Fictional Indian people
Indian film characters
Characters in novels of the 20th century
Fictional courtesans
Literary characters introduced in 1917